David William Mercer (20 March 1893 – 1 June 1950) was an English professional footballer who made over 220 appearances in the Football League for Sheffield United as an outside right. He also played league football for Hull City and Torquay United and won two caps for England.

Club career
After beginning his career in non-League football with Prescot Athletic and Skelmersdale United, Mercer joined Second Division club Hull City for a £40 fee on 22 January 1914. He made 91 league appearances and scored 26 goals for the club before moving to First Division Sheffield United on 13 December 1920, for a British record transfer fee of £4,500. He made 223 league appearances and scored 22 goals for the Bramall Lane club and won the 1924–25 FA Cup, before leaving in 1927. Aside from a spell with Torquay United during the 1929–30 season, Mercer played the remainder of his career in non-League football.

International and representative career 
Mercer represented the Football League XI and won two caps for England, scoring once, in a 6–1 victory over Belgium on 19 March 1923.

Personal life 
Mercer was the older brother of fellow footballer Arthur Mercer and the pair briefly played together at Sheffield United. Mercer's other brother Richard was an amateur footballer and his son David also became a professional footballer. In 1911, Mercer was working in a coal mine and in 1939 he was working as a golf club groundsman.

Honours
Sheffield United
FA Cup: 1924–25

Career statistics

References

1893 births
1950 deaths
English footballers
England international footballers
Sheffield United F.C. players
English Football League players
Association football outside forwards
English Football League representative players
Footballers from St Helens, Merseyside
Skelmersdale United F.C. players
Hull City A.F.C. players
Prescot Cables F.C. players
Shirebrook Miners Welfare F.C. players
Torquay United F.C. players
Dartmouth A.F.C. players
English miners
FA Cup Final players